The TOSHIBA 2011 Chinese FA Cup (Chinese: 东芝2011中国足球协会杯) was the 13th edition of Chinese FA Cup.

The match of first round began on 4 May 2011, and the final took place on 19 November 2011. Tianjin Teda won the title for the first time and earned a berth in the 2012 AFC Champions League.

The cup title sponsor is Japanese company Toshiba. A three-year deal was announced on 8 April 2011.

Schedule

Participants

Chinese Super League
Four of 2010 Chinese Super League teams are entered in Quarter-finals, Six of them are entered in Second round, Six of them are entered in First round, respectively. Total 16 teams took part in 2011 CFA Cup.

 Shandong Luneng Taishan (final)
 Tianjin TEDA (winner)
 Shanghai Shenhua (semi-finals)
 Hangzhou Greentown (quarter-finals)
 Beijing Guoan (semi-finals)
 Dalian Shide (second round)
 Liaoning Whowin (third round)
 Henan Jianye (quarter-finals)
 Changchun Yatai (third round)
 Shaanxi Renhe (quarter-finals)
 Jiangsu Sainty (first round)
 Shenzhen (first round)
 Nanchang Hengyuan (third round)
 Qingdao Jonoon (first round)
 Guangzhou Evergrande (second round)
 Chengdu Blades (first round)

China League One
All of China League One teams are entered in First round. Total 14 teams took part in 2011 CFA Cup.

 Chongqing Lifan (second round)
 Guangzhou R&F (second round)
 Yanbian Changbai Tiger (quarter-finals)
 Shanghai East Asia (second round)
 Hubei Wuhan Zhongbo (first round)
 Hunan Billows Baishijiao (first round)
 Shenyang Dongjin Shidai (first round)
 Beijing Baxy (first round)
 Shenyang Shenbei (second round)
 Guizhou Zhicheng (first round)
 Guangdong Sunray Cave (third round)
 Beijing 361 Degrees (first round)
 Dalian Aerbin (second round)
 Tianjin Songjiang (second round)

Results
In each matchup, the one with a higher rank last season will be the home team.

The ties are single matches, with a penalty shootout if necessary but no extra time, with the winners progressing to the next round.

First round

Second round

Third Round

Quarter-finals

Semi-finals

Final
The final is set to be played at a neutral venue which is the Olympic Sports Center in Hefei. The final is a single match, with extra time and penalty shootout if necessary.

Assistant referees:
 Takahiro Okano (Japan)
 Satoshi Karakami (Japan)
Fourth official:
Fan Qi (China)

Awards
 Top Scorer:  Muriqui (Guangzhou Evergrande)
 Most Valuable Player:  Yu Dabao (Tianjin Teda)
 Fair Play Award: Shandong Luneng

Goal scorers
4 goals
 Muriqui (Guangzhou Evergrande)

3 goals
 Gao Wanguo (Yanbian Baekdu Tigers)
 Wang Xinxin (Tianjin Teda)
 Yang Chen (Nanchang Hengyuan)

2 goals

 Joel Griffiths (Beijing Guoan)
 Christopher Katongo (Henan Construction)
 Lü Zheng (Shandong Luneng)
 Leandro Netto (Henan Construction)
 Wang Xiaolong (Beijing Guoan)
 Johnny Woodly (Dalian Aerbin)
 Yin Hongbo (Guangdong Sunray Cave)

1 goal

 Bai Yuefeng (Tianjin Teda)
 Beto (Shenzhen Phoenix)
 Cao Yunding (Shanghai Shenhua)
 Du Zhenyu (Changchun Yatai)
 Han Peng (Shandong Luneng)
 Hu Rentian (Tianjin Teda)
 Ji Jun (Nanchang Hengyuan)
 Jiang Zhipeng (Nanchang Hengyuan)
 Ladji Keita (Beijing Guoan)
 Li Kuanglun (Beijing BIT)
 Liang Yanfeng (Shenzhen Phoenix)
 Liu Yintao (Nanchang Hengyuan)
 Liu Zhongyi (Chongqing Lifan)
 Lü Wenjun (Shanghai East Asia)
 Darko Matić (Beijing Guoan)
 Mauro (Guizhou Toro) 
 Nei (Changchun Yatai)
 Roberto (Beijing Guoan)
 Sun Bo (Dalian Aerbin)
 Tan Binliang (Guangdong Sunray Cave)
 Wang Dong (Changchun Yatai)
 Wang Lichun (Guizhou Toro) 
 Wang Shenchao (Shanghai East Asia)
 Wang Xuanhong (Dalian Shide)
 Wang Weicheng (Chongqing Lifan)
 Wen Chao (Shenzhen Phoenix)
 Xing Xufei (Liaoning Whowin)
 Xu Bo (Yanbian Baekdu Tigers)
 Xu Jingjie (Qingdao Jonoon)
 Xu Liang (Beijing Guoan)
 Xu Xiaobo (Chongqing Lifan)
 Yu Dabao (Tianjin Teda)
 Yu Hai (Shaanxi Renhe)
 Zhang Chiming (Chongqing Lifan)
 Zhang Lu (Henan Construction)
 Zhang Wenzhao (Changchun Yatai)
 Zhang Xizhe (Beijing Guoan)
 Zhu Jiawei (Shaanxi Renhe)

References

External links
Official Website
2011 Chinese FA Cup

2011
2011 in Chinese football
2011 domestic association football cups